Janet Trujillo is an American politician from Idaho. Trujillo served as a Republican member of Idaho House of Representatives for District 33 from 2012 to 2017. Since leaving the House, Trujillo has served as a commissioner of the Idaho State Tax Commission.

Early life and education 
Trujillo was born in Salt Lake City, Utah. Trujillo graduated from Hillcrest High School in Utah. Trujillo earned a certificate in dental assisting from Jordan Technical College and studied business management at Salt Lake Community College in Utah.

Career 
Trujillo was a certified tax appraiser for Bonneville County, Idaho.

On November 6, 2012, Trujillo won the election and to the Idaho House of Representatives for District 33 seat A. Trujillo defeated Christopher Joseph Brunt and Mary E. Haley with 60.9% of the votes. She was re-elected in 2014, defeat John Boyd Radford with 57.5% of the votes. She was again re-elected in 2016, defeating Jim De Angelis with 65.8% of the votes.

In December 2017, during Trujillo's third term as a legislator, she was appointed as a commissioner of Idaho State Tax Commission by Governor Butch Otter. Trujillo replaced Rich Jackson. Trujillo's term is expected to end in December 2023. Barbara Ehardt was appointed to succeed Trujillo's term in Idaho House.

Election history

Personal life 
Trujillo's second husband was Lowell Trujillo. They are divorced.

In December 2016, Trujillo married Mike Moyle, a politician in Idaho. They have four children. Trujillo and her husband live in Star, Idaho.

References

External links 
 Janet Trujillo at legislature.idaho.gov
 

Year of birth missing (living people)
Living people
Republican Party members of the Idaho House of Representatives
People from Idaho Falls, Idaho
Politicians from Salt Lake City
Salt Lake Community College alumni
Women state legislators in Idaho
21st-century American politicians
21st-century American women politicians